The geography of Prince Edward Island is mostly pastoral with red soil, white sand, and scattered communities. Known as the "Garden of the Gulf", the island is located in the Gulf of Saint Lawrence north of Nova Scotia and east of New Brunswick, with which it forms the Northumberland Strait.

Overview

Prince Edward Island (PEI) consists of the capital city Charlottetown, as well as urban towns Cornwall and Stratford and a developing urban fringe. As with all natural harbours on the island, Charlottetown and Summerside harbours are created by rias. (See also a list of communities in Prince Edward Island.)

The island's landscape is pastoral; rolling hills, pristine forests, white sand beaches, ocean coves and the red soil have given PEI a reputation as a province of outstanding natural beauty. A number of laws have been passed by the provincial government to attempt to preserve the landscape through regulation, although the lack of consistent enforcement and absence of province-wide zoning and land-use planning has resulted in some unsightly development in recent years.

The island's lush landscape has had a strong bearing on the island's culture. During the late Victorian Era, author Lucy Maud Montgomery used the island as the setting of her novel Anne of Green Gables. Today, the island attracts tourists in all seasons, with popular leisure attractions including beaches, golf courses, and eco-tourism.

Communities

Most rural communities on Prince Edward Island are based on small-scale agriculture, and the average size of farm properties less than other areas in Canada. There is an increasing amount of industrial farming as older farm properties are consolidated and modernized.

Coastline

The coastline of the island consists of a combination of long beaches, dunes, red sandstone cliffs, saltwater marshes and numerous bays and harbours. The beaches, dunes and sandstone cliffs consist of sedimentary rock and other material with a high iron concentration which oxidizes upon exposure to the air. The geological properties of white silica sand found at Basin Head are unique in the province; the sand grains cause a scrubbing noise as they rub against each other under pressure. Large dune fields on the north shore can be found on barrier islands at the entrances to various bays and harbours. The sand dunes at Greenwich have a shifting, parabolic dune system that is home to a variety of birds and rare plants and is also a site of significant archaeological interest.

Climate
The climate of the island is a maritime climate considered to be moderate and strongly influenced by the surrounding seas. As such, it is milder than inland locations owing to the warm waters from the Gulf of St. Lawrence.  The climate is characterized by changeable weather throughout the year; it has some of the most variable day-to-day weather in Canada, in which specific weather conditions seldom last for long.

Winters are moderately cold and long but are milder than inland locations, with clashes of cold Arctic air and milder Atlantic air causing frequent temperature swings. The climate is considered to be more humid continental climate than oceanic since the Gulf of St. Lawrence freezes over, thus eliminating any moderation. During the winter months, the island usually has many storms (which may produce rain as well as snow) and blizzards since during this time, storms originating from the North Atlantic or the Gulf of Mexico frequently pass through. Springtime temperatures typically remain cool until the sea ice has melted, usually in late April or early May.

Autumn is a pleasant season, as the moderating Gulf waters delay the onset of frost, although storm activity increases compared to the summer. There is ample precipitation throughout the year, although it is heaviest in the late autumn, early winter and mid spring.

The following climate chart depicts the average conditions of Charlottetown, as an example of the small province's climate.

See also

List of parks in Prince Edward Island
List of islands of Prince Edward Island

Notes

References

External links